Wunderlichia mirabilis is a plant species endemic to the highlands of east-central Brazil. It is known from the states of Espírito Santo, Minas Gerais, Goias, and São Paulo.

W. mirabilis is a branching tree up to 5 m tall. Leaves are broadly ovate to lanceolate, thick, and leathery. Flower heads have a large urn-shaped receptacle with whitish, tomentose phyllaries tapering toward the tip. Flowers are wind-pollinated.

References

Wunderlichioideae
Flora of Brazil